Repnoa is a genus of moths in the family Megalopygidae. It contains only one species, Repnoa imparilis, which is found in French Guiana.

The antennae are ochreous and the palpi and frons blackisli brown. There are white hairs at the base of the antennae. The vertex is pale yellow and the collar and thorax are dark grey. The patagia is white and the abdomen is brown, black above, whitish underneath. There is a subdorsal patch at the base, and pale yellow anal hairs. The forewings are grey, with the costa, veins and fringe white and with a faint whitish shade from the cell at vein 2 to the inner margin. The hindwings are darker grey, with the fringe white and with a whitish spot at the end of the cell.

Subspecies
Repnoa imparilis imparilis
Repnoa imparilis alba Hopp, 1927

References

Further reading
 

Megalopygidae
Megalopygidae genera